Satrajit Lahiri (born 26 February 1971) is an Indian former cricketer. He played in twelve first-class and eight List A matches for Tripura from 1990 to 1998. He is now an umpire, standing in a match in the 2020–21 Syed Mushtaq Ali Trophy.

See also
 List of Tripura cricketers

References

External links
 

1971 births
Living people
Indian cricketers
Indian cricket umpires
Tripura cricketers
Place of birth missing (living people)